Spring Lake is a town in Cumberland County, North Carolina, United States. The 2010 census recorded the population at 11,964 people, with an estimated population in 2019 of 12,005.

History 
The current name of the town first appeared around 1923 when Arthur Priddy opened the Spring Lake service station in relation to the lake (Spring Lake Pond) that ran beside the rail line. Previously, the area was called "Clayton Cut", due to the pathway cut that ran through the area where the railroad later resided, and also "Prince's Siding", after a man named Prince who owned a sawmill on this land.

Spring Lake was officially incorporated on April 9, 1951. Grady Howard was named interim mayor on this date, and was officially elected the first mayor of Spring Lake on June 5, 1951.

The modern growth spurt beginning in World War II is attributed to the proximity of Fort Bragg.

Long Valley Farm was listed on the National Register of Historic Places in 1994.

Geography
Spring Lake is located in northwestern Cumberland County at  (35.177593, -78.975501). It is bordered to the south by the city of Fayetteville, the Cumberland County seat, to the west by Hoke and Moore counties, and to the north by Harnett County. Large portions of the town limits are occupied by Pope Air Force Base and parts of Fort Bragg.

North Carolina Highways 87 and 24 run concurrently through the town, leading south  to downtown Fayetteville. NC 87 leads north  to Sanford, while NC 24 runs northwest  to Carthage. North Carolina Highway 210 leads northeast  to Lillington and southeast as Murchison Road  to downtown Fayetteville.

The Little River, a tributary of the Cape Fear River, runs the length of the town from west to east, passing north of the town center.

Demographics

2020 census

As of the 2020 United States census, there were 11,660 people, 4,369 households, and 2,653 families residing in the town.

2010 census
As of the census of 2010, there were 11,964 people, 4,202 households, and 2,880 families residing in the town. The population density was 517.9 people per square mile (200.4/km). There were 4,855 housing units at an average density of 210.2 units per square mile (81.3/km). The racial makeup of the town was 47.2% White, 36.3% African American, 1.1% Native American, 3.0% Asian, 0.5% Pacific Islander, 5.1% some other race, and 6.9% from two or more races. Hispanic or Latino of any race were 15.4% of the population.

There were 4,202 households, out of which 46.2% had children under the age of 18 living with them, 44.7% were headed by married couples living together, 18.8% had a female householder with no husband present, and 31.5% were non-families. 25.5% of all households were made up of individuals, and 4.0% were someone living alone who was 65 years of age or older. The average household size was 2.65, and the average family size was 3.21.

In the town, the population was spread out, with 31.2% under the age of 18, 19.3% from 18 to 24, 31.8% from 25 to 44, 13.0% from 45 to 64, and 4.8% who were 65 years of age or older. The median age was 24.9 years. For every 100 females, there were 104.0 males. For every 100 females age 18 and over, there were 106.2 males.

For the period 2009–13, the estimated median annual income for a household in the town was $36,538, and the median income for a family was $38,243. Male full-time workers had a median income of $34,921 versus $29,473 for females. The per capita income for the town was $15,852. About 19.5% of families and 23.2% of the population were below the poverty line, including 28.7% of those under age 18 and 21.1% of those age 65 or over.

Law and government
In May 2009, Spring Lake's police department was stripped of its authority, with the Cumberland County Sheriff's Office assuming command in the town.  This happened after two of its senior officers were arrested on an array of charges including embezzlement, larceny, obstruction of justice, second-degree kidnapping, and breaking and entering.  The District Attorney dropped the majority of misdemeanor cases the department had investigated, saying "We can no longer rely upon the basic presumed integrity of the work product of this department."  Chief of Police A.C. Brown resigned in the aftermath of the scandal.  The town has since revamped the department with the hiring of new officers and a new police chief, Dysoaneik Spellman. The power to investigate misdemeanors was restored in 2010.

Spring Lake is served by a mayor and town board. Members are elected for two year renewable terms. The current board consists of mayor Kia Anthony and aldermen Marvin Lackman, Raul Palacios as well as alderwomen Adrian Jones Thompson, Sona Cooper and mayor pro-tem Robyn Chadwick.

The next municipal election in Spring Lake will be in November 2023.

Notable people
 Jim Carter, professional golfer and 1983 NCAA champion
 Vanessa Grubbs, nephrologist and a writer
 Harold Landry, NFL linebacker
 Marvin W. Lucas, politician, retired principal

References

External links
 
 Town of Spring Lake official website

Towns in Cumberland County, North Carolina
Towns in North Carolina
Populated places established in 1923
Fayetteville, North Carolina metropolitan area